Christ Church, North Adelaide is an Anglican church on Acre 745 which lays between Jeffcott Street and 36-40 Palmer Place, South Australia, Australia. The foundation stone was laid on 1 June 1848 by Augustus Short, the first Bishop of Adelaide; and the church was consecrated in 1849. Christ Church was the pro-cathedral until 1877 when St Peter's Cathedral opened.

In 1850 a parsonage was built on the southern half of Acre 745. It became the deanery for Dean Marryat in 1887, then a rectory from 1906.

In 1868 a site on Jeffcott Street opposite the church was purchased for a schoolroom. The foundation stone was laid on 26 September.

The building
The church building is in the Romanesque Revival architectural style and was built under the direction of architects Henry Stuckey and William Weir. It is built of local limestone mined from Palmer Place, with slate roof tiles from Willunga.

The church, rectory and hall are all heritage listed with the former two appearing on the South Australian Heritage Register and the latter appearing on a 'local' list maintained by the City of Adelaide.

Organ
The church's first instrument was a harmonium, replaced in 1854 by the pipe organ from J. B. Graham's mansion Prospect House ("Graham's Castle"), and opened by George Bennett, one of his last performances. The new acquisition was heavily criticised, then refurbished and greatly enlarged the following year. It still had faults: it was so badly affected by weather that in winter it took six kerosene lamps burning for an hour before it would play. 
A new organ was purchased from Augustus Gurm of London and the old one bought by organist James Shakespeare.
It was later installed in the Norwood Baptist Church where it served until replaced by J. E. Dodd in 1884.

Liturgy
Worship in the church follows the Book of Common Prayer.

People
Priests:
John Woodcock (1849–1868)
Charles Marryat (1868–1906)
George Jose (1907–1933)
Charles Murray (1933–1938)
Arthur Leslie Bulbeck (1938–1957)
George Benjamin McWilliams (1957–1965)
Richard Mellon Southey (1966–1973)
Alexander Russell Cameron (1973–1990)
John Paul Collas (1991–2002)
Simon Bailey (2003–2007)
Lyndon Brad Sulzberger (2007–2012)
Keith Patrick Brice (2013-2020)
Stephen James Bloor (2021-)

Others
James Pollitt
Henry Sparks
W. A. Hughes
Canon Wise (curate 1895–1897)

See also 

 List of Anglican churches in South Australia
 Australian non-residential architectural styles

References

External links
 

Churches in Adelaide
Romanesque Revival church buildings in Australia
Anglican churches in South Australia
19th-century Anglican church buildings
South Australian Heritage Register
North Adelaide
1849 establishments in Australia
Churches completed in 1849
Limestone churches